Ziselmius, or Zibelmius or Zisemis (Ancient Greek: Ζισέλμιος) was a chieftain of the Thracian Caeni tribe and son of Diegylis.

References

See also 
List of Thracian tribes

Thracian kings
2nd-century BC rulers in Europe